Stratavia, formerly known as ExtraQuest, was a software company that specialized in enterprise Database and Data Center Automation, and private cloud computing enablement. Stratavia was founded by Venkat Devraj and Rainier Luistro in 2001.

The company held two patents for automating standard operating procedures in database administration, and was included in the analyst firm Gartner's list of Cool Vendors for 2009.

The company received venture funding from Vista Ventures, Asset Management Company and Adams Street Partners and is headquartered in Denver, Colorado, with offices in San Francisco, New York City, Atlanta, Boston and London, United Kingdom. In Aug. 2010, HP announced the acquisition of Stratavia to bolster its cloud computing and automation software portfolio.

HP Software Division planned to integrate Stratavia technology into its cloud computing portfolio, including HP Cloud Service Automation Software.

References

External links 
 HP Software official site
  HP Software Solutions Community

Companies established in 2001
Defunct software companies of the United States
Companies based in Denver
Hewlett-Packard acquisitions